Arisaema section Odorata is a section of the genus Arisaema. This section was described in 2013 in "A nomenclatural review on the infrageneric classification of Arisaema (Araceae)" in the Journal of Japanese Botany.

Description
Plants in this section are winter dormant with leaves that are trifoliolate or pedate to radiate. The flower spadix is female or monoecious.

Distribution
Plants from this section are distributed in China, Vietnam, Myanmar, and Thailand.

Species
Arisaema section Odorata comprises the following species:

References

Plant sections